Germain Burger (3 October 1900 – 7 October 1986) was a British cinematographer and film director.

Selected filmography
Cinematographer
 Irish and Proud of It (1936)
 The Penny Pool (1937)
 Down Our Alley (1939)

Director
 Devil's Rock (1938)
 Sheepdog of the Hills (1941)
 Rose of Tralee (1942)
 Death by Design (1943)
 My Ain Folk'' (1945)

References

External links
 

1900 births
1986 deaths
Film directors from London